The SBB-CFF-FFS Am 841 was built at the Meinfesa locomotive plant in Albuixech, Spain in 1994. The locomotives were based on the RENFE Class 311.

See also
GA DE900 locomotives : locomotive class including the Am841 and versions sold to railways of Egypt and Israel.
SNCF Class BB 60000 : a later and similar product from the Meinfesa factory in Spain.

References

External links

Am 841
Diesel-electric locomotives of Switzerland
Bo′Bo′ locomotives
Macosa/Meinfesa/Vossloh Espana locomotives
Standard gauge locomotives of Switzerland
Railway locomotives introduced in 1994